The 1998 Scotland rugby union tour of Fiji and Australia was a series of matches played in May–June 1998 in Fiji and Australia by Scotland national rugby union team. The Scottish team lost all the test matches.

In the first match of the tour, Fiji claimed their first victory against a Five Nations side.

Results
Scores and results list Scotland's points tally first.

References 

1998 rugby union tours
1998 in Oceanian rugby union
1997–98 in Scottish rugby union
1998
1998 in Fijian rugby union
1998 in Australian rugby union
1998
1998
History of rugby union matches between Australia and Scotland